A spring is a device consisting of an elastic but largely rigid material (typically metal) bent or moulded into a form (especially  a coil) that can return into shape after being compressed or extended. Springs can store energy when compressed. In everyday use the term often refers to coil springs, but there are many different spring designs. Modern springs are typically manufactured from spring steel. An example of a non-metallic spring is the bow, made traditionally of flexible  yew wood, which when drawn stores energy to propel an arrow.

When a conventional spring, without stiffness variability features, is compressed or stretched from its resting position, it exerts an opposing force approximately proportional to its change in length (this approximation breaks down for larger deflections). The rate or spring constant of a spring is the change in the force it exerts, divided by the change in deflection of the spring. That is, it is the gradient of the force versus deflection curve. An extension or compression spring's rate is expressed in units of force divided by distance, for example or N/m or lbf/in. A torsion spring is a spring that works by twisting; when it is twisted about its axis by an angle, it produces a torque proportional to the angle. A torsion spring's rate is in units of torque divided by angle, such as N·m/rad or ft·lbf/degree. The inverse of spring rate is compliance, that is: if a spring has a rate of 10 N/mm, it has a compliance of 0.1 mm/N. The stiffness (or rate) of springs in parallel is additive, as is the compliance of springs in series.

Springs are made from a variety of elastic materials, the most common being spring steel. Small springs can be wound from pre-hardened stock, while larger ones are made from annealed steel and hardened after manufacture. Some non-ferrous metals are also used, including phosphor bronze and titanium for parts requiring corrosion resistance, and low-resistance beryllium copper for springs carrying electrical current.

History
Simple non-coiled springs have been used throughout human history, e.g. the bow (and arrow). In the Bronze Age more sophisticated spring devices were used, as shown by the spread of tweezers in many cultures. Ctesibius of Alexandria developed a method for making springs out of an alloy of bronze with an increased proportion of tin, hardened by hammering after it was cast.

Coiled springs appeared early in the 15th century, in door locks. The first spring powered-clocks appeared in that century and evolved into the first large watches by the 16th century.

In 1676 British physicist Robert Hooke postulated Hooke's law, which states that the force a spring exerts is proportional to its extension.

Types

Classification 

Springs can be classified depending on how the load force is applied to them:

 Tension/extension spring The spring is designed to operate with a tension load, so the spring stretches as the load is applied to it.
 Compression spring Designed to operate with a compression load, so the spring gets shorter as the load is applied to it.
 Torsion spring Unlike the above types in which the load is an axial force, the load applied to a torsion spring is a torque or twisting force, and the end of the spring rotates through an angle as the load is applied.
 Constant spring Supported load remains the same throughout deflection cycle
 Variable spring Resistance of the coil to load varies during compression
 Variable stiffness spring Resistance of the coil to load can be dynamically varied for example by the control system, some types of these springs also vary their length thereby providing actuation capability as well 

They can also be classified based on their shape:

 Flat spring Made of a flat spring steel.
 Machined spring Manufactured by machining bar stock with a lathe and/or milling operation rather than a coiling operation. Since it is machined, the spring may incorporate features in addition to the elastic element. Machined springs can be made in the typical load cases of compression/extension, torsion, etc.
 Serpentine spring A zig-zag of thick wire, often used in modern upholstery/furniture.
 Garter spring A coiled steel spring that is connected at each end to create a circular shape.

Common types 

The most common types of spring are:

 Cantilever spring A flat spring fixed only at one end like a cantilever, while the free-hanging end takes the load.
 Coil spring Also known as a helical spring. A spring (made by winding a wire around a cylinder) is of two types:
 Tension or extension springs are designed to become longer under load. Their turns (loops) are normally touching in the unloaded position, and they have a hook, eye or some other means of attachment at each end.
 Compression springs are designed to become shorter when loaded. Their turns (loops) are not touching in the unloaded position, and they need no attachment points.
 Hollow tubing springs can be either extension springs or compression springs. Hollow tubing is filled with oil and the means of changing hydrostatic pressure inside the tubing such as a membrane or miniature piston etc. to harden or relax the spring, much like it happens with water pressure inside a garden hose. Alternatively tubing's cross-section is chosen of a shape that it changes its area when tubing is subjected to torsional deformation: change of the cross-section area translates into change of tubing's inside volume and the flow of oil in/out of the spring that can be controlled by valve thereby controlling stiffness. There are many other designs of springs of hollow tubing which can change stiffness with any desired frequency, change stiffness by a multiple or move like a linear actuator in addition to its spring qualities.
 Arc spring A pre-curved or arc-shaped helical compression spring, which is able to transmit a torque around an axis.
 Volute spring A compression coil spring in the form of a cone so that under compression the coils are not forced against each other, thus permitting longer travel.
 Balance spring Also known as a hairspring. A delicate spiral spring used in watches, galvanometers, and places where electricity must be carried to partially rotating devices such as steering wheels without hindering the rotation.
 Leaf spring A flat spring used in vehicle suspensions, electrical switches, and bows.
 V-spring Used in antique firearm mechanisms such as the wheellock, flintlock and percussion cap locks. Also door-lock spring, as used in antique door latch mechanisms.

Other types 

Other types include:

 Belleville washer A disc shaped spring commonly used to apply tension to a bolt (and also in the initiation mechanism of pressure-activated landmines)
 Constant-force spring A tightly rolled ribbon that exerts a nearly constant force as it is unrolled
 Gas spring A volume of compressed gas.
 Ideal spring An idealised perfect spring with no weight, mass, damping losses, or limits, a concept used in physics. The force an ideal spring would exert is exactly proportional to its extension or compression.
 Mainspring A spiral ribbon-shaped spring used as a power store of clockwork mechanisms: watches, clocks, music boxes, windup toys, and mechanically powered flashlights
 Negator spring A thin metal band slightly concave in cross-section. When coiled it adopts a flat cross-section but when unrolled it returns to its former curve, thus producing a constant force throughout the displacement and negating any tendency to re-wind. The most common application is the retracting steel tape rule.
 Progressive rate coil springs A coil spring with a variable rate, usually achieved by having unequal distance between turns so that as the spring is compressed one or more coils rests against its neighbour.
 Rubber band A tension spring where energy is stored by stretching the material.
 Spring washer Used to apply a constant tensile force along the axis of a fastener.
 Torsion spring Any spring designed to be twisted rather than compressed or extended. Used in torsion bar vehicle suspension systems.
 Wave spring various types of spring made compact by using waves to give a spring effect.

Physics

Hooke's law

An ideal spring acts in accordance with Hooke's law, which states that the force with which the spring pushes back is linearly proportional to the distance from its equilibrium length:

where
 x is the displacement vector – the distance and direction the spring is deformed from its equilibrium length.
 F is the resulting force vector – the magnitude and direction of the restoring force the spring exerts
 k is the rate, spring constant or force constant of the spring, a constant that depends on the spring's material and construction. The negative sign indicates that the force the spring exerts is in the opposite direction from its displacement
Most real springs approximately follow Hooke's law if not stretched or compressed beyond their elastic limit.

Coil springs and other common springs typically obey Hooke's law. There are useful springs that don't: springs based on beam bending can for example produce forces that vary nonlinearly with displacement.

If made with constant pitch (wire thickness), conical springs have a variable rate. However, a conical spring can be made to have a constant rate by creating the spring with a variable pitch. A larger pitch in the larger-diameter coils and a smaller pitch in the smaller-diameter coils forces the spring to collapse or extend all the coils at the same rate when deformed.

Simple harmonic motion

Since force is equal to mass, m, times acceleration, a, the force equation for a spring obeying Hooke's law looks like:

The mass of the spring is small in comparison to the mass of the attached mass and is ignored. Since acceleration is simply the second derivative of x with respect to time,

This is a second order linear differential equation for the displacement  as a function of time. Rearranging:

the solution of which is the sum of a sine and cosine:

Energy dynamics 
In simple harmonic motion of a spring-mass system, energy will fluctuate between kinetic energy and potential energy, but the total energy of the system remains the same. A spring that obeys Hooke's Law with spring constant k will have a total system energy E of:

Here, A is the amplitude of the wave-like motion that is produced by the oscillating behavior of the spring.

The potential energy U of such a system can be determined through the spring constant k and its displacement x:

The kinetic energy K of an object in simple harmonic motion can be found using the mass of the attached object m and the velocity at which the object oscillates v:

Since there is no energy loss in such a system, energy is always conserved and thus:

Frequency & period 
The angular frequency ω of an object in simple harmonic motion, given in radians per second, is found using the spring constant k and the mass of the oscillating object m:

The period T, the amount of time for the spring-mass system to complete one full cycle, of such harmonic motion is given by:

The frequency f, the number of oscillations per unit time, of something in simple harmonic motion is found by taking the inverse of the period:

Theory
In classical physics, a spring can be seen as a device that stores potential energy, specifically elastic potential energy, by straining the bonds between the atoms of an elastic material.

Hooke's law of elasticity states that the extension of an elastic rod (its distended length minus its relaxed length) is linearly proportional to its tension, the force used to stretch it. Similarly, the contraction (negative extension) is proportional to the compression (negative tension).

This law actually holds only approximately, and only when the deformation (extension or contraction) is small compared to the rod's overall length. For deformations beyond the elastic limit, atomic bonds get broken or rearranged, and a spring may snap, buckle, or permanently deform. Many materials have no clearly defined elastic limit, and Hooke's law can not be meaningfully applied to these materials. Moreover, for the superelastic materials, the linear relationship between force and displacement is appropriate only in the low-strain region.

Hooke's law is a mathematical consequence of the fact that the potential energy of the rod is a minimum when it has its relaxed length. Any smooth function of one variable approximates a quadratic function when examined near enough to its minimum point as can be seen by examining the Taylor series. Therefore, the force – which is the derivative of energy with respect to displacement – approximates a linear function.

Force of fully compressed spring

where

 E – Young's modulus
 d – spring wire diameter
 L – free length of spring
 n – number of active windings
  – Poisson ratio
 D – spring outer diameter

Zero-length springs
 
"Zero-length spring" is a term for a specially designed coil spring that would exert zero force if it had zero length; if there were no constraint due to the finite wire diameter of such a helical spring, it would have zero length in the unstretched condition. That is, in a line graph of the spring's force versus its length, the line passes through the origin. Obviously a coil spring cannot contract to zero length, because at some point the coils touch each other and the spring can't shorten any more.

Zero length springs are made by manufacturing a coil spring with built-in tension (A twist is introduced into the wire as it is coiled during manufacture; this works because a coiled spring "unwinds" as it stretches), so if it could contract further, the equilibrium point of the spring, the point at which its restoring force is zero, occurs at a length of zero. In practice, zero length springs are made by combining a "negative length" spring, made with even more tension so its equilibrium point would be at a "negative" length, with a piece of inelastic material of the proper length so the zero force point would occur at zero length.

A zero length spring can be attached to a mass on a hinged boom in such a way that the force on the mass is almost exactly balanced by the vertical component of the force from the spring, whatever the position of the boom. This creates a horizontal "pendulum" with very long oscillation period. Long-period pendulums enable seismometers to sense the slowest waves from earthquakes. The LaCoste suspension with zero-length springs is also used in gravimeters because it is very sensitive to changes in gravity. Springs for closing doors are often made to have roughly zero length, so that they exert force even when the door is almost closed, so they can hold it closed firmly.

Uses

 Airsoft gun
 Aerospace
 Retractable ballpoint pens
 Buckling spring keyboards
 Clockwork clocks, watches, and other things
 Firearms
 Forward or aft spring, a method of mooring a vessel to a shore fixture
 Industrial Equipment
 Jewelry: Clasp mechanisms
 Most folding knives, and switchblades
 Lock mechanisms: Key-recognition and for coordinating the movements of various parts of the lock.
 Spring mattresses
 Medical Devices
 Pogo Stick
 Pop-open devices: CD players, tape recorders, toasters, etc.
 Spring reverb
 Toys; the Slinky toy is just a spring
 Trampoline
 Upholstery coil springs
 Vehicle suspension, Leaf springs

See also 
 Shock absorber
 Slinky, helical spring toy
 Volute spring

References

Further reading
 Sclater, Neil. (2011). "Spring and screw devices and mechanisms." Mechanisms and Mechanical Devices Sourcebook. 5th ed. New York: McGraw Hill. pp. 279–299. . Drawings and designs of various spring and screw mechanisms.
 Parmley, Robert. (2000). "Section 16: Springs." Illustrated Sourcebook of Mechanical Components. New York: McGraw Hill.  Drawings, designs and discussion of various springs and spring mechanisms.
 Warden, Tim. (2021). “Bundy 2 Alto Saxophone.” This saxophone is known for having the strongest tensioned needle springs in existence.

External links

 
 
 
 Springs with Dynamically Variable Stiffness (patent)
 Smart Springs and their Combinations (patent)